The 2006 Under 19 Rugby World Championship took place in United Arab Emirates between 4 April and 21 April 2006. Australia won the final over New Zealand 17–13.

Pool/standings 
The IRB setting for this tournament was that the matches were to be played between two pools from which the top 4 teams qualified for the semifinals and the team that finished at the bottom of the Division A pool was to be relegated to the Division B.
Pool A played against Pool D
Pool B played against Pool C

Match points were awarded on the basis of 4 points for a Win, 2 points for a draw and 0 points for a Loss. Bonus points were awarded for teams scoring 4 tries or more and to losing teams who lost be 7 points or less.

Division A

Groups

Group phase

Knock out phase

9th-place play-off

5th-place play-off

1st-place play-off

Division B

Groups

Group phase

Knock out phase

9th-place play-off

5th-place play-off

1st-place play-off

Final standings 

* Romania was initially demoted to Division B and Fiji promoted to Division A for next World Championship.

# Chile, Russia, Namibia, Chinese Taipei, South Korea and USA were relegated from Division B and had to enter regional competitions to qualify for next World Championship.

Sources 
 Official site

2006 rugby union tournaments for national teams
2006
International rugby union competitions hosted by the United Arab Emirates
rugby union
2006 in youth sport